The 35th Air Defense Artillery Brigade (ADAB) is an Air Defense Artillery unit of the United States Army subordinate to the Eighth United States Army, located at Osan Air Base in the Republic of Korea.  35th ADAB has integrated the Terminal High Altitude Area Defense (THAAD) into its layered defense on the Korean Peninsula. D Battery 2nd Air Defense Artillery Regiment (ADAR).

History
It was reactivated in November 1948 at Fort Bliss, Texas. The 35th Anti-Aircraft Brigade subsequently moved to Fort Meade, Maryland in 1950 to provide anti-aircraft defense of Washington, DC and to plan the defense of other cities in the vicinity. There, the 35th Anti-Aircraft Brigade set an Air Defense Artillery milestone as it became the first Nike-Ajax guided missile command in 1957. In March 1958, the Brigade was redesignated as the 35th Artillery Brigade (Air Defense), and operated the country's first Nike-Hercules site at Davidsonville, Maryland. It included the 1st Battalion, 52nd ADAR. The Brigade was inactivated on 4 June 1973 at Fort Meade, Maryland.

Structure 
  35th ADAB, at Osan Air Base (South Korea)
  Headquarters and Headquarters Battery
  2nd Battalion, 1st ADAR, at Camp Carroll (MIM-104 Patriot)
  6th Battalion, 52nd ADAR, at Suwon Air Base (MIM-104 Patriot, AN/TWQ-1 Avenger)
  Battery D, 2nd ADAR, at Camp Carroll

Previous Units
1st Battalion, 43rd ADAR
 Headquarters and Headquarters Battery (HHB)
 Alpha Battery (PATRIOT) - Camp Humphreys
 Bravo Battery (PATRIOT) - Suwon, AB
 Charlie Battery (PATRIOT) - Camp Humpherys
 Delta Battery - (PATRIOT) - Osan, AB
 Echo Battery - (AVENGER AND SENTINEL TEAMS) - Camp Humphreys
 Fox Company - (Maintenance) - Suwon, AB

References

External links

The Institute of Heraldry: 35th Air Defense Artillery Brigade
35th Air Defense Artillery Brigade

035
Military units of the United States Army in South Korea
Military units and formations established in 2005